Catherine Néris (born 9 June 1962) is a French politician, who, from 2007 until 2009, was a Member of the European Parliament (MEP) representing the Overseas Territories of France for the Socialist Party.

Parliamentary service
Member, Committee on the Internal Market and Consumer Protection.

References

1962 births
Living people
Politicians from Paris
Socialist Party (France) MEPs
MEPs for France 2004–2009
21st-century women MEPs for France